AGT may refer to:

Arts and entertainment
 A Global Threat, a Boston-based street punk band
 Adventure Game Toolkit
 America's Got Talent, NBC reality show
 Australia's Got Talent, Seven Network reality show

Biology and medicine
 Agaritine, a hydrazine derivative
 AGT, a codon for the amino acid Serine
 Angiotensinogen, a protein
 Antiglobulin test, also known as Coombs test
 O-6-methylguanine-DNA methyltransferase, a protein

Government
 Alberta Government Telephones, a Canadian public utility
 Attorney General of Tanzania
 Attorney-General of Tasmania
 Attorney General of Texas
 Attorney General of Tonga

Places
 Aldrington railway station, a railway station in Sussex, England (station code: AGT)
 Guaraní International Airport, Paraguay (by IATA code)
 AGT Tower, Edmonton, Alberta, Canada

Vehicular technologies
 Automated guideway transit: a driverless guideway technology usually used in urban rail transit systems
 Honywell AGT-1500, an engine used in armoured tanks

Other uses
 Advanced Global Trading, a Dubai firm
 Central Cagayan Agta language of the Philippines (by ISO code)
 Dries van Agt, Dutch Prime Minister 1977–1982

See also
 Agta (disambiguation)